Ciudad Deportiva is a metro station along Line 9 of the Mexico City Metro. It is named for the nearby the Magdalena Mixhuca Sports City.

Magdalena Mixuhca Sports City was enlarged in 1967 as part of the project to create the venues needed for the 1968 Summer Olympics.
The Sports City is home to the Autódromo Hermanos Rodríguez (racetrack), the Estadio Alfredo Harp Helú (baseball stadium), the Foro Sol (concert venue),
the Agustín Melgar Olympic Velodrome, and the Palacio de los Deportes (indoor arena).

The station is elevated and sits in the median of the Viaducto Río Piedad. It was opened 26 August 1987.
The logo for the station represents a player engaged in a Mesoamerican ballgame (a similar logo is used for Metro Deportivo 18 de Marzo on lines 3 and 6).

In December 2009 a man in his 30s was shot twice in the back next to the station. From 23 April to 15 May 2020, the station was temporarily closed due to the COVID-19 pandemic in Mexico.

Ridership

References

External links
 

Ciudad Deportiva
Railway stations opened in 1987
1987 establishments in Mexico
Mexico City Metro stations in Iztacalco
Mexico City Metro stations in Venustiano Carranza, Mexico City
Accessible Mexico City Metro stations